Rik Van Slycke (2 February 1963) is a former Belgian cyclist. He is now a directeur sportif with the Quick Step cycling team.

Major results

1989
1st Nokere Koerse
1992
10th Stage 20 Tour de France
1993
9th Trofeo Laigueglia

References

Directeur sportifs
Living people
1963 births
Belgian male cyclists
Sportspeople from Ghent
Cyclists from East Flanders